= Sister Pie =

Restaurant in Detroit, Michigan, U.S.

- Interactive map of Sister Pie

Restaurant information
- Location: 8066 Kercheval Avenue, Detroit, Michigan, United States
- Coordinates: 42°21′31″N 82°59′55″W
- Website: sisterpie.com

Sister Pie is a restaurant in Detroit, Michigan, United States. It was established in 2015.

== History ==
Lisa Ludwinski is the owner. She published the cookbook Sister Pie: The Recipes and Stories of a Big-Hearted Bakery in Detroit in 2018. She was a 2020 finalist in the Outstanding Baker category of the James Beard Foundation Awards.

== Reception ==
Ashok Selvam of Eater Detroit has said Sister Pie is "hailed as one of the best pie bakeries in America". The pizzeria was included in Eater's 2025 list of the 38 "most essential — and influential — restaurants in America of the past 20 years".
